Alberte Kjær Pedersen (born 23 June 1998) is a Danish long-distance runner. She competed in the senior women's race at the 2019 IAAF World Cross Country Championships held in Aarhus, Denmark. She finished in 80th place.

References

External links 
 

Living people
1998 births
Place of birth missing (living people)
Danish female long-distance runners
Danish female cross country runners
Danish female triathletes
Triathletes at the 2014 Summer Youth Olympics
Competitors at the 2019 Summer Universiade
20th-century Danish women
21st-century Danish women